Gralhas is a parish and village in Montalegre Municipality, northern Portugal. The population in 2011 was 208, in an area of 21.59 km2.

It is located at the base of Serra do Larouco ("Mountain Range of the Larouco").

References

Freguesias of Montalegre